Alexandra Landry (born 10 February 1994) is a Canadian group rhythmic gymnast she represents her nation at international competitions she participated at the 2012 Summer Olympics in London. She also competed at world championships, including group competition at the 2011 World Rhythmic Gymnastics Championships.

References

1994 births
Living people
Canadian rhythmic gymnasts
Gymnasts from Montreal
Gymnasts at the 2012 Summer Olympics
Olympic gymnasts of Canada
Pan American Games medalists in gymnastics
Pan American Games silver medalists for Canada
Pan American Games bronze medalists for Canada
Gymnasts at the 2011 Pan American Games
Medalists at the 2011 Pan American Games
20th-century Canadian women
21st-century Canadian women